Daroca de Rioja is a village in the province and autonomous community of La Rioja, Spain.

Places of interest 
 Sierra de Moncalvillo

References

Populated places in La Rioja (Spain)